Mulugu is a town in Mulugu district, Telangana. It is the headquarters of the district, which was formed in 2019 after Jayashankar Bhupalpally district was split. Prior to the reorganization of districts that created Jayashankar Bhupalpally district, Mulugu was a part of the Warangal district. It lies on National Highway 163.

Government and politics 
Mulugu Major was constituted in 2011 and is classified as a second grade municipality.

Politics 
Mulugu has one seat for state Assembly constituency. Danasari Anasuya   Congress(Inc) was elected as Member of Legislative Assembly in the   2018 general elections. It is a grade 2 municipality. The R.D.O. and M.R.O. look after the revenue administration. Recently Area Hospital(Mini MGM) Opened In Mulugu And Tribal University Also Sanctioned Here.

Weather 

Mulugu has a semi-tropical climate, where the people and its surroundings are pleasant and enjoyable. During summers, the temperatures soar to more than 48 °C. In winters, temperatures range between 12 °C and 27 °C, which is pleasant. Mulugu receives the North-East and the South-West monsoon, from June to September, and from October to November respectively. Mainly relies on the monsoons and rainfall.

Media 

Mulug has print and entertainment media. There is also In Mulugu Cable, a local entertainment channel for broadcasting TV

Print media 
Leading news papers, viz. NamastheTelangana, Sakshi, Eenadu, Vaartha, Andhra Jyothi, Prajasakti, Andhra Bhoomi, The Hindu, Deccan Chronicle, and Times Of India are available. Sirachukka is the local tabloid circulated weekly.

Transport 

Mulugu is well connected with road routes to every other place of the state and the nation. And It Has National HighWay 163 Passing From Mulugu To Chhattisgarh

Roadways 
Mulugu has a bus stand of TSRTC with 40-bus capacity. It has many services for the needs of the citizens. It falls on the main route of Warangal-Bhadrachalam. Nearly 20,000 people go from here daily through the bus facilities. In addition,  many seven-seat autorickshaws and Commander Jeeps connecting the nearby villages.

Demographics 

The population of Mulugu is around 46,851 according to 2011 census reports. The male population is 23,716 (48.3%) and the female is 22,135 (51.6%). The female-to-male ratio is 1068:1000, which is above the national average 943:1000. The literacy rate is 79.17%, more than national average 74%.
Male literacy is 86.59%, which is more than national average of 82.10%, and female literacy rate is 72.32%, more than national average 65.50%. Once it was the biggest revenue division in Telangana state,

The languages spoken are Telugu as the main language (100%), and then Hindi (40%), and few people can speak Urdu (7%). Educated people can speak English (45%). Telugu and English are used in official communications and media of instructions.

The majority of the villages and the hamlets including the city are the habitats of Scheduled Tribes (75%). The tribal community is Lambadi. Thus the majority of people of the city will communicate in the special tribal language, Lambadi or Banjara (60%). This language is one among the officially recognised dialects by the government of India. This language has no script and is sustained on spoken words.

Healthcare 
The 100-bed Mini Mahatma Gandhi Memorial Hospital is the largest hospital in the city. It also serves the needs of patients from the neighbouring districts of Khammam and Karimnagar.

Apart from major public hospitals such as those for maternity, chest and tuberculosis, there are many private specialist hospitals including Appaiah, Ravinder, Star, Superspeciality, Area Hospital, and St.Ann's.,

References 

Cities and towns in Mulugu district
Mandals in Mulugu district